Nicholas Ronald Ormerod OBE (born 9 December 1951) is a British theatre designer and co-founder of the international theatre company Cheek by Jowl. In 1981 he founded Cheek by Jowl with Declan Donnellan, and they are the company's co-artistic directors. In addition to his Cheek by Jowl productions, Ormerod has made theatre, opera and ballet with companies across the world. He studied law at Trinity College, Cambridge before studying for BA in theatre design at the Wimbledon School of Art.

Biography
Ormerod was born and grew up in London, England. He studied law at Trinity College, Cambridge before studying for a BA in theatre design at the Wimbledon School of Art. In 1981 Ormerod founded Cheek by Jowl with Declan Donnellan. The company has performed across the world, working in over 400 cities in 40 countries spanning six continents. Since 2006 Cheek by Jowl have been part of the Barbican's International Theatre Program (BITE) resulting in co-productions of The Changeling (2006), Cymbeline (2007) and Troilus and Cressida (2008).

In addition to his work with Cheek by Jowl, Ormerod designed the Royal Shakespeare Company’s productions of School for Scandal (1998) and King Lear (2002 Academy Production). In 2005, he co-wrote an adaptation of Charles Dickens’s Great Expectations (2005) for the Royal Shakespeare Company with Declan Donnellan. He designed Shakespeare's Troilus and Cressida for the Burgtheater, Vienna in 2000, and Falstaff for the Salzburg Festival in 2001. In London, Ormerod designed Hay Fever (play) at the Savoy Theatre, and Shakespeare in Love (play) at the Noel Coward Theatre.

For the Royal National Theatre Ormerod designed both parts of Angels in America by Tony Kushner, as well as Sweeney Todd, Peer Gynt and Fuenteovejuna.

In 2000 he and Donnellan formed a company of actors in Moscow, under the auspices of The Chekhov Festival, whose productions include Boris Godunov, Twelfth Night and Three Sisters. For the Bolshoi Theatre he has designed Romeo and Juliet in 2003, and Hamlet in 2015. Other work in Russia includes The Winter's Tale for the Maly Drama Theatre of St. Petersburg in 1997. With Cheek by Jowl he and Donnellan have produced further work in Russian including The Tempest with the Chekhov Festival and Measure for Measure in a co-production with Moscow's Pushkin Theatre.

Ormerod was nominated for the Laurence Olivier Award Designer of the Year in 1988 for A Family Affair, The Tempest and Philoctetes and won the Corral de Comedias Award with Donnellan in 2008. He directed the 2012 film Bel Ami, an adaption of the Maupassant novel.

Ormerod was appointed Officer of the Order of the British Empire (OBE) in the 2017 Birthday Honours for services to theatre design.

Stage productions

Cheek by Jowl

2016-17 The Winter's Tale ... William Shakespeare
2014 Measure for Measure ...William Shakespeare
2013 Ubu Roi ... Alfred Jarry
2011 Tis Pity She's a Whore ... John Ford (dramatist)
2009 Macbeth ... William Shakespeare
2008  Troilus and Cressida ... by William Shakespeare
2008  Boris Godunov ... by Aleksandr Pushkin
2007  Three Sisters ... by Anton Chekhov
2007  Cymbeline ... by William Shakespeare
2006  The Changeling ... by Thomas Middleton and William Rowley
2005  Great Expectations ... adapted from Charles Dickens
2004  Othello ... by William Shakespeare
2002  Homebody / Kabul ... by Tony Kushner ..... British premiere
1998  Much Ado About Nothing ... by William Shakespeare
1997  Out Cry ... by Tennessee Williams ..... British premiere
1995  The Duchess of Malfi ... by John Webster
1994  As You Like It (revival) ... by William Shakespeare
1994  Measure for Measure ... by William Shakespeare
1993  Don't Fool With Love ... by Alfred de Musset
1993  The Blind Men ... by Michel de Ghelderode ..... British premiere
1991  As You Like It ... by William Shakespeare
1990  Hamlet ... by William Shakespeare
1990  Sara ... by Gotthold Ephraim Lessing ... British premiere
1989  Lady Betty ... by Declan Donnellan ..... British premiere
1988  The Tempest ... by William Shakespeare
1988  Philoctetes ... by Sophocles
1988  A Family Affair ... by Alexander Ostrovsky ..... British premiere
1987  Macbeth ... by William Shakespeare
1986  Twelfth Night ... by William Shakespeare
1985  The Man of Mode ... by George Etherege
1985  A Midsummer Night's Dream ... by William Shakespeare
1985  Andromache ... by Jean Racine ..... British premiere
1984  Pericles ... by William Shakespeare
1983  Vanity Fair ... adapted by Donnellan from William Makepeace Thackeray ..... premiere
1982  Othello ... by William Shakespeare
1981  The Country Wife ... by William Wycherly

Other
2014 Shakespeare in Love, Noël Coward Theatre
2005 Great Expectations, with the RSC a new adaptation by Declan Donnellan and Nick Ormerod
2002 King Lear with the RSC Academy Company
2000 Boris Godunov at the Moscow Art Theatre
1996 Martin Guerre, West End
1993 Sweeney Todd: The Demon Barber of Fleet Street, Royal National Theatre
The Winter's Tale for the Maly Theater of St Petersburg
Falstaff at the Salzburg Festival

Bibliography
Approaching the Millennium: Essays on Angels in America, eds. Deborah R. Geis and Steven F. Kruger University of Michigan Press, Ann Arbor, Michigan, 1997
Reade, Simon. Cheek by Jowl: Ten Years of Celebration, Oberon Books (hardback) 1991 -- currently out of print
In Contact With the Gods?, Directors Talk Theatre, eds. Maria M. Delgado & Paul Heritage, Manchester University Press, Manchester, 1996
National Theatre Platform Papers No. 2 on Angels in America, National Theatre Publications Department

Footnotes

References

External links
Cheek by Jowl official website
nationaltheatre.org.uk
officiallondontheatre.co.uk/awards

British designers
1951 births
Living people
Alumni of Trinity College, Cambridge
Alumni of Wimbledon College of Arts
Artists from London
Officers of the Order of the British Empire
Theatre designers